Coloburiscidae is a family of mayflies in the order Ephemeroptera, with at least seven species in three genera native to Australia, New Zealand, and Chile.

Genera
These three genera belong to the family Coloburiscidae:
 Coloburiscoides Lestage, 1935 - Australia
 Coloburiscus Eaton, 1888 - New Zealand
 Murphyella Lestage, 1930 - Chile

References

Further reading

 

Mayflies
Insect families